Guney-ye Gharbi Rural District is in Tasuj District of Shabestar County, East Azerbaijan province, Iran. At the National Census of 2006, its population was 7,867 in 2,295 households. There were 7,505 inhabitants in 2,395 households at the following census of 2011. At the most recent census of 2016, the population of the rural district was 8,339 in 2,856 households. The largest of its nine villages was Til, with 3,303 people.

References 

Shabestar County

Rural Districts of East Azerbaijan Province

Populated places in East Azerbaijan Province

Populated places in Shabestar County